Chocolate lily refers to any of a number of flowering plant species:

 Dichopogon strictus (syn. Arthropodium strictum), whose flowers smell of chocolate
 Fritillaria affinis, also called rice-root or checker lily, from western North America
 Fritillaria biflora, with chocolate-brown flowers, in California
 Fritillaria camschatcensis (Kamchatka fritillary), with chocolate-brown flowers, in Alaska